Pamela Margaret Le Quesne (6 August 1931 - 2 August 1999), was a British neurologist and the first woman to be appointed to the House at the National Hospital for Neurology and Neurosurgery, Queen's Square, London, after the Second World War.

References

British neurologists
British medical writers
1931 births
1999 deaths